The 32nd annual Ale Kino! International Young Audience Film Festival was held from 30 November to 7 December 2014. A number of 115 movies, took part, some of them only in the non-competitive section.

The movies were presented in Multikino 51 cinema and Imperial Castle Cinema, as well as in Łejery Arts School and Children's Art Centre. A lot of additional events were held at the same time, like film workshops for the children and meetings with the filmmakers.

The movies were judged by eight different jury sets; professional and amateurish, separate for the feature and short movies.

Awards

References

External links
 32nd Ale Kino! Official Homepage
 32nd Ale Kino! at the Internet Movie Database

Ale Kino! Festival
Ale Kino! Festival
Ale Kino! Festival, 32
Ale Kino! Festival
Ale Kino! Festival
2014 festivals in Europe